Piazza San Lorenzo is a city square in Florence, Italy, with the Basilica di San Lorenzo situated at the centre.

History

The boundaries of the square have been partially revised over time. The name of the square refers to the basilica of San Lorenzo. Borgo San Lorenzo is a street located between piazza San Giovanni and piazza San Lorenzo.

The basilica is one of the oldest in Florence, having been consecrated in 393 AD, at which time it stood outside the city walls. For three hundred years it was the city's cathedral, before the official seat of the bishop was transferred to Santa Reparata.

The square is frequented by tourists who cross it to access the basilica complex and by the nearby Central Market and souvenir stalls. Since August 2013, the city has started a project to remove the benches aimed both at restoring    the historic architecture, and at introducing the passage of a connecting bus between Via Camillo Cavour and the Santa Maria station.

Structures
List of buildings in and around the square.

 Basilica of San Lorenzo, Florence
 Monument to Giovanni delle Bande Nere
 Palazzo Della Stufa
 Palazzo Medici Riccardi
 Medici Chapel
 Collegio degli Scolopi
 Osservatorio Ximeniano

See also
 List of squares in Florence

Gallery

Bibliography

 Municipality of Florence, Historical and administrative road map of the city and the Municipality of Florence , Florence, Tipografia Barbèra, 1913, p. 75, n. 529; p. 132, n. 930 (piazza delle Stimate).
 Piero Bargellini, Ennio Guarnieri, The streets of Florence, 4 vols., Florence, Bonechi, 1977–1978, II, 1977, pp. 156–161.
 Pietro Roselli, Orietta Superchi, The construction of the basilica of San Lorenzo, a story of urban importance, Florence, Clusf Cooperativa Editrice Universitaria, 1980.
 Gabriele Morolli, The Medici square and the buried column, in San Lorenzo 393–1993. Architecture, the history of the factory, catalog of the exhibition (Florence, Basilica of San Lorenzo, 25 September-12 December 1993) edited by Gabriele Morolli and Pietro Ruschi, Florence, Alinea Editrice, 1993, pp. 197–198.
 Francesco Cesati, The great guide to the streets of Florence, Newton Compton Editori, Rome 2003.

References

Lorenzo
Odonyms referring to religion